André Andrejew (21 January 1887 – 13 March 1967) was one of the most important art directors of the international cinema of the twentieth century. He had a distinctive, innovative style. His décors were both expressive and realistic. French writer Lucie Derain described Andrejew at the peak of his career as "an artist of the grand style, blessed with a vision of lyrical quality." Edith C. Lee wrote recently: "Believing in creative freedom rather than academic reconstruction, André Andrejew fulfilled the 20th century's notion of the romantic, individualistic artist. The unusual titillated his imagination."

Early life
André Andrejew was born in Schawli (Lithuanian: Šiauliai), Russian Empire (now Lithuania), on 21 January 1887 as Andrej Andreyev (Russian: Андрей Андреев). He studied architecture at the Fine Arts Academy in Moscow. At the time in Russia, architecture could be studied at technical universities and with the more artistic angle at art academies, where accent was on interior design and decor and students were trained as artists. After the studies, André Andrejew worked as a scene designer at the Konstantin Stanislavski's Moscow Art Theatre.

In Berlin
After the October revolution of 1917, Andrejew left Russia. In Germany and Austria, he worked as stage designer in theater productions in Berlin and Vienna, working among others with Max Reinhardt. In 1921/1922, he designed stage decorations for the Jasha Jushny's Der Blaue Vogel (Blue Bird), a legendary Russian émigré cabaret at Goltzstrasse in Berlin.

In 1923, he designed his first cinema décor for Raskolnikow, directed by Robert Wiene, film based upon Dostoyevsky's Crime and Punishment. This expressionist work made him the foremost art director in Germany. Rudolf Kurtz in his Expressionismus und Film (1926) wrote: Andrejew is a typical Moscow mixture, distinction of the streaked folk art (his decors) dissolves the rhythm of images, creates gentle forms, establishes balance even when everything is broken and torn.

Germany produced at the time hundreds of feature movies each year, and as cinema was silent, they were often  produced in a co-production with France and released in both countries with different language inter-titles. Andrejew designed décors for several major German and Franco-German productions directed by Pabst, Feyder, Duvivier, Christian-Jacque. The titles of this period include Dancing Vienna, Pandora's Box, The Threepenny Opera, Don Quixote, The Golem, Meyerling.

Especially interesting is today The Threepenny Opera (1930), directed by G.W. Pabst. Andrejew built for this film huge sets of the imaginary London. These decors artistically continue German Expressionism of the 1920s, but bring it to another level, creating the world far more realistic, intense and somber.

France, Great Britain, Czechoslovakia: 1933-1940
Immediately after Hitler took power in Germany in 1933, Andrejew as several other Russian artists living in Berlin left for Paris. At first he worked with the directors who also left Germany (Fedor Ozep, Alexis Granowsky, G. W. Pabst), but later with the most successful French filmmakers of the time, working on art direction of numerous film productions in France, England, and Czechoslovakia.
In collaboration with Pimenoff, Andrejew art directed 'Les Yeux Noirs'. Following this came sumptuous sets for 'Les Nuits Moscovites' and 'Myerling'. His sets for Duvivier's 'Golem' made in Prague were remarkable, the camera reproducing the artist's original designs very faithfully. Toeplitz brought Andrejew to England in 1937 to make 'The Dictator', and he stayed on to make 'Whom the Gods Love' for Basil Dean. Both these films were set against lavish eighteenth century backgrounds on which he was so much at home(...)Until 1937 he was associated with many productions for London Films but returned to his chateau in France in 1938.
Just before the World War II, Andrejew was active in France making decors for two films with Pabst and several other films with L'Herbier, Ozep, Pottier, Lacombe and Mirande.

War years in France: 1940-1944
When Germany invaded France in May 1940 and the Vichy regime was established, German producer Alfred Greven and his firm Continental Films continued to produce French films. These films were shown in cinemas in France and other occupied by Germany countries, where cinema had to be kept alive while it has been seen by the Nazi regime, as an important propaganda tool. Several directors left France escaping the Nazis as Luis Buñuel and Jean Renoir, but the directors who stayed in France like Marcel Carné, Jean Cocteau, Sacha Guitry continued to make films and André Andrejew continued to design and build film décors. These French films had nothing to do with the occupiers ideology. Their default was to pretend normality, while Europe suffered under the Nazi German occupation.

Le Corbeau controversy
In 1943, André Andrejew worked as a production designer on Le Corbeau, a thriller by Henri-Georges Clouzot. This anti-authoritarian film became very controversial during the occupation, when it was seen as indirectly attacking the Nazi system, and censored; yet after the liberation of France in August 1944, Le Corbeau was perceived as being made by collaborators, and it was rumored to have been released in Germany as Nazi anti-French propaganda, when in fact it was suppressed by the Germans.

However, the film was disliked by all political parties in postwar France, and there was a strong consensus to treat this movie as a scapegoat for a national feeling of guilt for not putting up enough resistance against Nazi Germany. Clouzot was at first banned for life from directing films in France; his actors, who acted also in other movies, were sentenced to long prison terms.

Several important personalities in France, including artist Jean Cocteau and philosopher Jean-Paul Sartre, went to the defense of Le Corbeau and Clouzot himself.  Clouzot's ban was commuted to three years, counted from the release of Le Corbeau, which in fact meant two years' ban.  Andrejew, as his close collaborator, was banned for nine months, forcing him to renew his English contacts.

The French ban on Le Corbeau was lifted only in 1969.

Final years — Hollywood productions
Andrejew continued to work as a production designer in England, France, and since 1948, he designed décors for several major international productions as Anna Karenina, Alexander the Great (shot in Spain), and Anastasia.

Anna Karenina produced by Alexander Korda and directed by Julien Duvivier, with the cinematography by Henri Alekan, costumes by Cecil Beaton and Vivien Leigh in the title part, stands out in Andrejew's work as probably one of his best films. Andre Andrejew has done something good that very few set designers for films set in czarist Russia are able to do: create the impression of sumptuous wealth without making the rooms look like nearly barbaric combination of harems and safaris. The seeming alien-ness of Russia, particularly before 1917, has influenced many set designers to make the place look strange and combine several bizarre cultures which have nothing to do with anything. This production of Anna Karenina takes into account something very important: Upper class Russians were, in effect, Europeans, and they tended to live in the same sort of surroundings as other Victorian-era Europeans did.´In Alexander the Great (1956), Andrejew successfully used existing elements of primitive Spanish architecture to create the richness and glory of ancient Greece and Persia in far more authentic way, than the plaster and plywood decorations in similar Hollywood films of the time. Andrejew's ideas were continued a decade later in the mythological films directed by Pier Paolo Pasolini, Edipo re (Oedipus Rex, 1967) with the production design by Luigi Scaccianoce, and Medea (1969) with the production design by Dante Ferretti.

Andrejew briefly returned to Berlin in 1952, to work on a Carol Reed's The Man Between. He made his last movies in the mid-1950s in Germany (then West Germany).

André Andrejew died of natural causes in Loudun, south of Paris on 13 March 1967.

Influence of Andrejew on production design in film
Through his individual style of the art directing, the visual wealth and the artistic quality of his decors and the sheer number of films produced in different countries, Andrejew influenced for more than thirty years aesthetics of the art directing in Europe and America. Several production designers were following his style and today Andrejew is regarded as a classic. Edith C. Lee writes about him: As critics began to condemn any strongly stated art direction as distracting, Andrejew slightly toned down his style. Nonetheless, he maintained his belief in the importance of intrinsic meaning in design.Andrejew's production drawings are today in the collections in France and Great Britain, they also appear on art auctions and offering by the commercial galleries in France. Cinémathèque Française in Paris presented several of Andrejew's gouaches during the exhibition 'Le cinéma expressionniste allemand — Splendeurs d'une collection (French Expressionist Cinema — Splendors of the Collection) ´ - held in winter of 2007. They were collected by Lotte H. Eisner, German film historian living in France, who documented for the Cinémathèque works of the most important Filmarchitekte of the German expressionist cinema.

Filmography
This is a filmography of films made by André Andrejew as a production designer or an art director, as in Europe at the time there was no sharp distinction between these functions.
This filmography lists a year of release (not of production), an original title of the film and the name of its director. Eventual Andrejew's collaborators are mentioned before the film director's name. Additionally, after some titles, some significant names of the cast or of the crew have been noted.

Germany: 1923 – 1933Silent films:1923: Raskolnikov, Directed by Robert Wiene
1923: Die Macht der Finsternis, in collaboration with Heinrich Richter, Directed by Conrad Wiene
1925: Letters Which Never Reached Him, in collaboration with Gustav A. Knauer, Directed by Frederic Zelnik
1925: Old Mamsell's Secret, in collaboration with Gustav A. Knauer, Directed by Paul Merzbach
1925: The Dealer from Amsterdam, in collaboration with Gustav A. Knauer, Directed by Victor Janson
1925: The Bank Crash of Unter den Linden, in collaboration with Gustav A. Knauer, Directed by Paul Merzbach
1926: The Bohemian Dancer, in collaboration with Gustav A. Knauer, Directed by Frederic Zelnik, Cast: Lya Mara (Försterchristl)
1926: The Mill at Sanssouci, in collaboration with Gustav A. Knauer, Directed by Siegfried Philippi and Frederic Zelnik
1926: The Circus of Life, in collaboration with Karl Görge and August Rinaldi, Directed by Mario Bonnard and Guido Parish
1926: The Violet Eater, in collaboration with Hermann Krehan, Directed by Frederic Zelnik
1926: Superfluous People, in collaboration with Stefan Lhotka, Directed by Alexander Rasumny
1926: Fadette, in collaboration with Alexander Ferenczy, Directed by Frederic Zelnik
1927: The Gypsy Baron, in collaboration with Alexander Ferenczy, Directed by Frederic Zelnik
1927: The Weavers, Directed by Frederic Zelnik, Makeup designer: George Grosz
1927: Alpine Tragedy, Directed by Robert Land
1927: The Golden Abyss, Directed by Mario Bonnard
1927: Dancing Vienna, also known as An der schönen blauen Donau. 2. Teil, Directed by Frederic Zelnik
1927: Die Spielerin, in collaboration with Alexander Ferenczy; Directed by Graham Cutts, based upon Dostoyevski's The Player
1927: Im Luxuszug, Directed by Erich Schönfelder
1928: Thérèse Raquin, Directed by Jacques Feyder
1928: Mariett Dances Today, in collaboration with Erich Zander, Directed by Frederic Zelnik
1928: Two Red Roses, Directed by Robert Land
1928: Marie Lou, Directed by Frederic Zelnik
1928: Der Ladenprinz, Directed by Erich Schönfelder
1928: The Saint and Her Fool, Directed by Wilhelm Dieterle
1929: My Heart is a Jazz Band, Directed by Frederic Zelnik; Cast: Lya Mara, Carl Goetz, Iwan Kowal-Samborskij, Alfred Abel
1928: Rapa-nui, Directed by Mario Bonnard
1928: Volga Volga, Directed by Victor Tourjansky
1928: Der Herzensphotograph, Directed by Max Reichmann
1929: Diane, Directed by Erich Waschneck, Cast: Henry Victor (Oberst Guy de Lasalle, Kommandant von Tschamschewa), Olga Tschechowa (Diane), Pierre Blanchar (Leutnant Gaston Mévil)
1929: Pandora's Box, in collaboration with Gottlieb Hesch (Bohumil Heš); Directed by Georg Wilhelm Pabst, Cast: Louise Brooks (Loulou)
1929: The Love of the Brothers Rott, Directed by Erich Waschneck, Cast: Olga Chekhova aka Olga Tschechova (Theresa Donath) who also produced the film
1929: Der Narr seiner Liebe, Directed by Olga Chekhova aka Olga Tschechova
1929: Sprengbagger 1010, Directed by Carl Ludwig Achaz-Duisberg, Cast: Heinrich George (Direktor March), Viola Garden (Olga Lossen)
1930: Revolte im Erziehungshaus, Directed by Georg Asagaroffsound films:'''1930: The Last Company, Directed by Curtis Bernhardt (as Kurt Bernhardt)
1931: The Threepenny Opera, Directed by Georg Wilhelm Pabst; Treatment by Bertolt Brecht based upon the musical by Bertolt Brecht with the music by Kurt Weill. Screenplay by Leo Lania, Ladislaus Vajda and Béla Balázs
1931: The Theft of the Mona Lisa, in collaboration with Robert A. Dietrich; Directed by Geza von Bolvary
1931: His Highness Love, in collaboration with Erich Kettelhut; Directed by Robert Péguy and Erich Schmidt
1931: , in collaboration with Robert A. Dietrich; directed by Geza von Bolvary
1932: Don Quixote, Directed by Georg Wilhelm Pabst; Cast: Feodor Chaliapin (Don Quixotte)
1932: Mirages de Paris, in collaboration with Lucien Aguettand; Directed by Fedor Ozep - * Note: a film produced in Germany in a co-production with France
1933: Grosstadtnacht, Directed by Fédor Ozep - * Note: a film produced in Germany in a co-production with France

France, Great Britain, Czechoslovakia : 1933 – 1940
1933: Cette vieille canaille, Directed by Anatole Litvak, Cast: Harry Baur (Professor Vautier), Alice Field (Helene), Kiki de Montparnasse aka Alice Prin (Kiki)
1933: On the Streets, Directed by Victor Trivas
1933: Volga in Flames, Directed by Victor Tourjansky
1934: Moscow Nights, Directed by Alexis Granowsky; Music Bronisław Kaper aka Bronislau Kapper and Walter Jurmann
1934: Whom the Gods Destroy, Directed by Walter Lang, Cast: Walter Connolly (John Forrester aka Eric Jann aka Peter Korotoff); * Note: a film produced in Great Britain
1935: The Dictator, Directed by Victor Saville; * Note: a film produced in Great Britain
1935: Taras Bulba, Directed by Alexis Granowsky
1936: Mayerling, Directed by Anatole Litvak, Written by: Marcel Achard, Claude Anet (novel), Joseph Kessel, Irma von Cube, Cast: Charles Boyer (Archduke Rudolph of Austria) and Danielle Darrieux (Marie Vetsera)
1936: Le Golem, in collaboration with Štěpán Kopecký; Directed by Julien Duvivier, * Note: a film produced in France, shot in Czechoslovakia
1936: The Beloved Vagabond, Directed by Curtis Bernhardt; * Note: film by a German director produced in Great Britain
1936: , Directed by W.L. Bagier and Martin Frič, Written by: Hugo Haas and Otakar Vávra; * Please Note: a film produced in Czechoslovakia
1937: Dark Journey originally released as The Anxious Years, with the collaboration of Ferdinand Bellan; Directed by Victor Saville; Cast: Conrad Veidt (Baron Karl Von Marwitz), Vivien Leigh (Madeleine Goddard); * Please note: a film produced in Great Britain
1937: The Citadel of Silence, Directed by Marcel L'Herbier
1938: Princess Tarakanova, Directed by Fedor Ozep, Cast: Annie Vernay
1938: The Shanghai Drama, Directed by Georg Wilhelm Pabst
1938: Lights of Paris, Directed by Richard Pottier
1939: The White Slave, Directed by Marc Sorkin; Supervised by Georg Wilhelm Pabst
1939: Jeunes filles en détresse, Directed by Georg Wilhelm Pabst
1939: Les Musiciens du ciel, Directed by Georges Lacombe
1939: Paris-New York, Directed by Yves Mirande

France, war time: 1940 – 1944
1940: They Were Twelve Women, Directed by Georges Lacombe
1941: Caprices, Directed by Léo Joannon
1941: The Last of the Six, Directed by Georges Lacombe
1941: La Symphonie fantastique, Directed by Christian-Jacque
1941: Les évadés de l'an 4000, in collaboration with André Chaillez, Directed by Marcel Carné
1942: The Murderer Lives at Number 21, Directed by Henri-Georges Clouzot
1942: La Fausse maîtresse, Directed by André Cayatte
1942: La Main du diable, Directed by Maurice Tourneur
1942: Picpus, Directed by Richard Pottier
1942: Simplet, Directed by Fernandel and Carlo Rim
1943: Au bonheur des dames, Directed by André Cayatte
1943: Le Corbeau, Directed by Henri-Georges Clouzot
1943: La Ferme aux loups, Directed by Richard Pottier
1943: Mon amour est près de toi, Directed by Richard Pottier
1943: Pierre and Jean, Directed by André Cayatte
1944: Le dernier sou, Directed by André Cayatte; *Note: the movie released in 1946

Great Britain: 1947 – 1952
1947: A Man About the House, Directed by Leslie Arliss
1948: Anna Karenina, Directed by Julien Duvivier, Produced by Alexander Korda, Screenplay by Julien Duvivier, Guy Moran and Jean Anouilh from Leo Tolstoy's novel, Photography by Henri Alekan, Costumes by Cecil Beaton, Cast: Vivien Leigh (Anna Karenina)
1948: The Winslow Boy, Directed by Anthony Asquith, cast: Robert Donat (Sir Robert Morton), Cedric Hardwicke (Arthur Winslow)
1949: That Dangerous Age also known in US as If This Be Sin, Directed by Gregory Ratoff, Cast: Myrna Loy (Lady Cathy Brooke)
1949: Britannia Mews, Directed by Jean Negulesco, Cast: Dana Andrews (Gilbert Lauderdale/Henry Lambert)
1950: The Angel with the Trumpet, Directed by Anthony Bushell
1950: My Daughter Joy, Directed by Gregory Ratoff; Set Decoration by Dario Simoni; Cast: Edward G. Robinson (George Constantin)
1953: The Man Between, Directed by Carol Reed, Cast: James Mason (Ivo Kern), Claire Bloom (Susanne Mallison)

Big Hollywood productions: 1953 – 1956
1953: Melba, Directed by Lewis Milestone, Cast: Patrice Munsel (Nellie Melba)
1954: Mambo, Directed by Robert Rossen, Produced by Dino De Laurentiis and Carlo Ponti, Cast: Silvana Mangano (Giovanna Masetti), Vittorio Gassman (Mario Rossi), Shelley Winters (Toni Salerno)
1955: Alexander the Great, Directed by Robert Rossen, Cast: Richard Burton (Alexander the Great); *Note: a film shot in Spain
1956: Anastasia, Directed by Anatole Litvak, Cast: Ingrid Bergman (Anastasia), Yul Brynner (General Sergei Pavlovich Bounine)

Germany (West): 1956 – 1957
1956: Bonjour Kathrin, Directed by Karl Anton, Cast: Caterina Valente (Kathrin)
1957 (released in January 1958): Escape from Sahara, in collaboration with Helmut Neutwig and Fritz Lippman; Directed by Wolfgang Staudte

Further reading

About the German and French periods of Andrejew's work
 Rudolf Kurtz, Expressionismus und Film, Verlag der Lichtbildbühne, Berlin, 1926 (Reprint: Hans Rohr, Zürich, 1965)
 Jochen Meyer-Wendt, Zwischen Folklore und Abstraktion. Der Filmarchitekt Andrej Andrejew; a chapter in Fantaisies russes. Russische Filmmacher in Berlin und Paris 1920-1930, Jörg Schöning (Editor), CineGraph Buch, München, 1995, 187 pages, for Andrejew see page 113, ;
 Jean Loup Passek, Jacqueline Brisbois, Lotte H. Eisner, Vingt ans de cinéma allemand, 1913-1933: catalogue d'une exposition, 15. octobre-1. décembre 1978, Published by Centre National d'Art et de Culture Georges Pompidou, 1978
 Jeanpaul Goergen, Künstlerische Avantgarde, visionäre Utopie. Die Regisseure Victor Trivas und Alexis Granowsky., a chapter in Fantaisies russes. Russische Filmmacher in Berlin und Paris 1920-1930, Jörg Schöning (Editor), CineGraph Buch, München, 1995,  (in German)
 André Andrejew, Cinématographe n° 76, mars 1982 (in French)
 Expressionistischer Dekor im deutschen Stummfilm, Gabriela Grunwald, Universität Köln, 1985, University Diploma Work (in German)
 Mists of Regret: Culture and Sensibility in Classic French Film, Dudley Andrew, Princeton University Press, Princeton, New Jersey, USA, 1995,  (in English), pages 185-186
 City of Darkness, City of Light. Émigré Filmmakers in Paris 1929-1939, Alastair Phillips, Amsterdam University Press, Amsterdam 2003,  (in English)
 The French Cinema Book, by Michael Temple, Michael Witt;. London: BFI Publishing, 2004; 300pp; ; read about André Andrejew on pages 103, 109 - 111.

About the British and Hollywood periods of Andrejew's work
 Edward Carrick, Roger Manvell, Art and Design in the British film: a pictorial directory of British art directors and their work, comp. by Edward Carrick. With an introduction by Roger Manvell, Dobson, London 1948, re-edited by Arno Press, New York 1972, 
 Larry Langman, Destination Hollywood, The Influence of Europeans on American Filmmaking, Jefferson, North Carolina and London, 2000

References

  quoted after Pictorial directory of British art directors and their work, comp. by Edward Carrick.Dobson, London 1948
 . Often St. Petersburg is mistakenly given as a place of André Andrejew's birth.
  quoted from  Pictorial directory of British art directors and their work, comp. by Edward Carrick.Dobson, London 1948
  See Alfred Greven at IMDB.
 A Beauty, a Breakdown, and a Russian Epic, Anna Karenina'', A Review by Laurie Edwards
  French death certificate no. n° 28/1967 quoted at Les Gens du Cinema. Sometimes Leningrad(?)- a communist name for St. Petersburg, mistakenly and mysteriously (Andrejew lived in France and did not return to Russia) is reported as a place of Andrejew's death. Movie Database IMDb is one of the erroneous sources.

External links
 
 about the film Die Dreigroschenoper (1931), Directed by G. W.Pabst: Three Penny Opera. Brecht vs. Pabst by Jan-Christopher Horak, Jump Cut
 André Andrejew on Les Gens du Cinema, (as Andreĩ Andrejew)
 Anna Karenina (1948), a review by Laurie Edwards on Culture Dose
 a Cinémathèque Française site about the German film expressionism, reproducing drawings by Andrejew for Raskolnikov : (1923)
 a Cinémathèque Française page about Andrejew with the bio by Gabriela Trujillo (as Andrej Andrejew, in French)
 Working drawings by André Andrejew at the Galerie Michel Cabotse, Paris
 An info about André Andrejew and his drawings on the website Art & Design in The British Film # 2: Andre Andrejew 

1887 births
1967 deaths
People from Šiauliai
People from Shavelsky Uyezd
Russian art directors
Emigrants from the Russian Empire to the German Empire
German emigrants to France
French people of Russian descent
Russian film directors
Emigrants from the Russian Empire to France